Bernard McGlinchey (18 October 1932 – 11 April 2013) was an Irish businessman and Fianna Fáil politician. He was a member of Seanad Éireann from 1961 to 1981, and from 1982 to 1983.

Early life
McGlinchey was born to Patrick McGlinchey and his wife Sarah (née O'Boyle) in 1932, and educated at St Eunan's College. He had six older siblings and one younger one. He was expelled from secondary school.

Business career
A restaurant proprietor, McGlinchey founded the Golden Grill Nightclub, renowned as the unofficial Fianna Fáil headquarters and venue of party conventions. He was a millionaire.

Political career
McGlinchey was first elected to the Seanad by the Industrial and Commercial Panel in 1961. At the 1973 election he was elected by the Administrative Panel, and he was nominated by the Taoiseach in 1977. He did not contest the 1981 election, but in 1982 was nominated by the Taoiseach to the 16th Seanad.

At the start of his political career McGlinchey was closely linked with Neil Blaney. Paul M. Sacks, an American academic, wrote a book called The Donegal Mafia which detailed the actions of the two men and their team.

He once debated for 12 hours, a Seanad Éireann record for the longest speech.

McGlinchey stood for election to Dáil Éireann in the constituencies of Donegal North-East (1973, 1981, November 1982) and Donegal (1977), but was unsuccessful each time. He was a member of Donegal County Council for the Letterkenny area until 2004.

McGlinchey is said to have "practically invented as a politician" Jim McDaid, selecting "the young, presentable McDaid" and setting him on the path for a career in national politics. McDaid achieved what McGlinchey could not, being elected to the Dáil on his first attempt at the 1989 general election, eventually serving in government, as Minister for Tourism, Sport and Recreation between 1997 and 2002 and as Minister of State for Transport between 2002 and 2004, and being re-elected to the Dáil at every subsequent election until his retirement in 2010.

Personal life
McGlinchey married Elizabeth and had five children: three daughters and two sons. One of his daughters, Adrienne McGlinchey, featured in the national media in 2002 in relation to the Carty Inquiry. She was born in 1965 in Letterkenny and shared a flat in Buncrana between 1991 and 1995 with Yvonne Devine, a Letterkenny woman who had been employed by a restaurant run by McGlinchey family members in the town. Adrienne McGlinchey was arrested several times in this period, though records seem to exist mainly of one arrest in July 1991. A Garda sergeant acquainted with her described her as "a Walter Mitty type of person".

Bernard McGlinchey died at home, aged 80, on 11 April 2013. At the time of his death his partner was Kathleen Sweeney.

Memorial
Letterkenny Town Park is named after McGlinchey.

References

1932 births
2013 deaths
Fianna Fáil senators
Irish businesspeople
Local councillors in County Donegal
Members of the 10th Seanad
Members of the 11th Seanad
Members of the 12th Seanad
Members of the 13th Seanad
Members of the 14th Seanad
Members of the 16th Seanad
Nominated members of Seanad Éireann
People educated at St Eunan's College
People from Letterkenny
Irish political consultants
Politicians from County Donegal